Andreas Niederquell (born 18 November 1988) is a German former footballer who played as a midfielder.

Career
Niederquell made his professional debut for Wacker Burghausen in the 3. Liga on 25 July 2009, starting the match against Borussia Dortmund II, which finished as a 4–3 home win.

References

External links
 
 
 FC Töging statistics 2013–14
 FC Töging statistics 2014–15
 FC Töging II statistics 2014–15
 SV Gendorf Burgkirchen statistics 2016–17
 SV Gendorf Burgkirchen statistics 2017–18

1988 births
Living people
German footballers
Association football midfielders
SV Wacker Burghausen players
3. Liga players
Regionalliga players